Dafnoula (meaning little laurel) is a community and a mountain village in Elis in Greece. It is part of the municipal unit Andritsaina. The Alfeios forms the border with Arcadia to the north and east, the nearest village across the river is Agios Ioannis. The community Dafnoula includes the small village Chelidoni (pop: 6). Dafnoula has a small school, a church, and a small square.

Historical population

Persons 
Ioannis G. Tsatsaris (born in 1934) is a Greek author

See also 

List of settlements in Elis

External links 
Biography of Ioannis G. Tsatsaris

References
Notes

Andritsaina
Populated places in Elis